Mícheál Ó Cléirigh, sometimes known as Michael O'Clery, was an Irish chronicler, scribe and antiquary and chief author of the Annals of the Four Masters, assisted by Cú Choigcríche Ó Cléirigh, Fearfeasa Ó Maol Chonaire, and Peregrinus Ó Duibhgeannain. He was a member of the O'Cleric Bardic family and compiled with others the Annála Ríoghachta Éireann (Annals of the Kingdom of Ireland) at Bundrowse in County Leitrim on 10 August 1636. He also wrote the Martyrology of Donegal in the 17th century.

Background and early life
Grandson of Tuathal Ó Cléirigh, a chief of the sept of Uí Chléirigh in Donegal, he was born in Kilbarron near Creevy, between Rossnowlagh and Ballyshannon on Donegal Bay. He was baptised Tadhg Ó Cléirigh and was known by the nickname Tadhg an tSléibhe (meaning Tadhg of the mountain), but took the name of Mícheál when he became a Franciscan friar. He was the youngest of four sons of Donnchadh Ó Cléirigh and his mother was Onóra Ultach. Of his older brothers were Uilliam, Conaire and Maolmhuire, Conaire is known to have worked on the annals as a scribe, while Maolmhuire also became a Franciscan at Louvain. Micheál was a cousin of Lughaidh Ó Cléirigh, also famous as an Irish historian and author of one of the major sources of the annals.

As a member of one of the foremost learned families of Gaelic Ireland, Ó Cléirigh received a wide-ranging and thorough education. He records that he was taught, for instance, by Baothgalach Mac Aodhagáin, a learned cleric active in County Tipperary, who became the Bishop of Elphin. Tadhg followed Maolmhuire to continental Europe some time after the Flight of the Earls. He may be the Don Tadeo Cleri who was serving as a soldier in Spain in July 1621. At some point before March 1623 he became a lay brother of the Franciscan order. He was never ordained a priest.

Scholarship
Ó Cléirigh had already gained a reputation as an antiquary and student of Irish history and Irish literature, when he entered the Irish College of St Anthony at Louvain (Dutch: Leuven). In 1624, through the initiative of Aedh Buidh Mac-An-Bhaird (1580–1635), warden of the college, and himself a famous Irish historian and poet, and one of an old family of hereditary bards in Tyrconnell, he began to collect Irish manuscripts and to transcribe everything he could find of historical importance. To do this he returned to Ireland in 1626 and spent over a decade based at a Franciscan house by the River Drowes on the Donegal-Leitrim border. He was assisted by other Irish scholars, most notably Cú Choigcríche Ó Cléirigh, Fearfeasa Ó Maol Chonaire and Peregrinus Ó Duibhgeannain. Ó Cléirigh travelled widely throughout Ireland during this period, collecting and transcribing a vast quantity of Irish texts. His initial focus was material of ecclesiastical importance, particularly saints' lives, but by 1631 he and his colleagues were beginning to copy secular material such as the Irish pseudo-history Leabhar Gabhála.

In 1632 the group began to assemble the most extensive set of Irish annals ever compiled. The project took four years and resulted in the vast collection dubbed Annála Ríoghachta Éireann (Annals of the Kingdom of Ireland) but now better known as the Annals of the Four Masters. The 'four masters' in question are Mícheál Ó Cléirigh, Cú Choigcríche Ó Cléirigh, Fearfeasa Ó Maol Chonaire and Peregrine Ó Duibhgeannain and the term was devised by John Colgan. However, other important collaborators included Muiris mac Torna Uí Mhaolchonaire, and Ó Cléirigh's brother, Conaire. The work was completed in August 1636 and two manuscript copies of the annals were made. Ó Cléirigh had an interest in Irish Lexicography and compiled a well-known glossary. It has since been often known by the descriptive title , (in English: Michael O’Clery's Glossary). These two works are valuable for the etymological and encyclopaedic information contained in them.

Among the other works copied and compiled in this period were: the medieval Irish account of clashes with the Vikings, Cogad Gáedel re Gallaib, twice, (in 1629, and again in 1636); the royal genealogy, Réim Ríoghraidhe in 1630;  and Leabhar Gabhála (Book of Invasions) in 1631. He subsequently produced his Martyrologium of Irish saints, based on various ancient manuscripts, such as the Martyrology of Tallaght.

Later life and legacy
He returned to the continent in early 1637. The only work by Ó Cléirigh to be published in his lifetime was his glossary of 1643. His precise date of death is unknown, but he is generally thought to have died at Louvain in 1643.

Mícheál Ó Cléirigh appears as an historical character in Darach Ó Scolaí's novel, An Cléireach. In 1944, An Post issued two stamps to commemorate the 300th anniversary of the death of Ó Cléirigh. The Mícheál Ó Cléirigh Institute for the Study of Irish History and Civilisation at University College Dublin is named in his honour.

In 1942, the Creevy National School, in Ballyshannon, County Donegal was reopened as the Brother Mícheál Ó Cleirigh National School. It is a state-funded school for primary school-aged children, lying in the region where Ó Cléirigh was born.

See also
 Tadhg Og Ó Cianáin
 James Ussher
 Sir James Ware
 Mary Bonaventure Browne
 Dubhaltach Mac Fhirbhisigh
 Ruaidhrí Ó Flaithbheartaigh
 Uilliam Ó Duinnín
 Charles O'Conor (historian)
 Eugene O'Curry

Notes

References

Further reading
 Walsh, Paul (1947). Ó Lochlainn, Colm (ed.). Irish men of learning: Studies by Paul Walsh. Dublin: At the Sign of the Three Candles.
 Mac Craith, Mícheál (2007).  "'Beathaíonn na Bráithre na Briathra': The Louvain Achievement". Seanchas Ard Mhacha: Journal of the Armagh Diocesan Historical Society. 21/22: pp. 86–123. ISSN 0488-0196.

External links
 
 

1590s births
1643 deaths
People from County Donegal
17th-century Irish historians
Irish chroniclers
Irish scribes
Irish expatriates in Belgium
Irish expatriates in France
Irish-language writers
Irish Friars Minor